|}

The Mildmay Novices' Chase is a Grade One National Hunt chase in Great Britain which is open to horses aged five years or older. It is run on the Mildmay course at Aintree over a distance of about 3 miles and 1 furlong (3 miles and 210 yards, or 5,020 metres), and during its running there are nineteen fences to be jumped. The race is for novice chasers, and it is scheduled to take place each year during the Grand National meeting in early April.

The event was established in 1981, and its first two winners – Bregawn and Burrough Hill Lad – both went on to win the Cheltenham Gold Cup. The race used to be regularly sponsored by Mumm, but it has had several different sponsors since 2001. The latest of these, Betway, began supporting the event in 2017. It was upgraded to Grade One status from its 2014 running. 

The Mildmay Novices' Chase usually features horses which ran previously in the RSA Insurance Novices' Chase, and the last to win both races was Might Bite in 2017.

Winners

See also
 Horse racing in Great Britain
 List of British National Hunt races

References

 Racing Post:

 aintree.co.uk – Media Accreditation for the Crabbie's Grand National Festival 2015.
 pedigreequery.com – Mildmay Novices' Chase – Aintree.
 

National Hunt races in Great Britain
Aintree Racecourse
National Hunt chases
Recurring sporting events established in 1981
1981 establishments in England